Mikhail Nikolayevich Muravyov may refer to:
Mikhail Nikitich Muravyov (1757-1807), Russian poet and prose writer
Count Mikhail Muravyov-Vilensky (1796-1866), known for his suppression of the Polish-Lithuanian January Uprising of 1863
Count Mikhail Nikolayevich Muravyov (1845-1900), Russian diplomat and statesman, known for his activities in the Russian Far East
Mikhail Artemyevich Muravyov (1880–1918), Russian military figure and politician
Mikhail Muravyov (footballer) (born 1965), Russian footballer